Salyot is a village in UC Kuthiala, District Abbottabad, Khyber Pakhtunkhwa, Pakistan. It is located at 34°9'0N 73°7'0E with an altitude of 1137 metres (3733 feet). Neighbouring settlements include Bagwal Bandi, Bain Gojri and Shadial.

References

Populated places in Abbottabad District